Microsoft Advertising (formerly Bing Ads, Microsoft adCenter and MSN adCenter) is an online advertising platform developed by Microsoft that provides pay per click advertising on the Bing, Yahoo!, and DuckDuckGo search engines, as well as on other websites, mobile apps, and videos. In 2021, Microsoft Advertising surpassed US$10 billion in annual revenue.

History
Microsoft was the last of the "big three" search engines (which also includes Google and Yahoo!) to develop its own system for delivering pay per click (PPC) ads.  Until the beginning of 2006, all of the ads displayed on the MSN Search engine were supplied by Overture (and later Yahoo!).  MSN collected a portion of the ad revenue in return for displaying Yahoo!'s ads on its search engine.

As search marketing grew, Microsoft began developing its own system, MSN adCenter, for selling PPC advertisements directly to advertisers.  As the system was phased in, MSN Search (now Bing) showed Yahoo! and adCenter advertising in its search results.  Microsoft effort to create AdCenter was led by Tarek Najm, then general manager of the MSN division of Microsoft. In June 2006, the contract between Yahoo! and Microsoft had expired and Microsoft was displaying only ads from adCenter until 2010.

In November 2006 Microsoft acquired Deep Metrix, a company situated in Gatineau, Canada, that created web-analytics software. Microsoft has built new product adCenter Analytics based on the acquired technology. In October, 2007 the beta version of Microsoft Project Gatineau was released to a limited number of participants.

In May 2007, Microsoft agreed to purchase the digital marketing solutions parent company, aQuantive, for roughly $6 billion. Microsoft later resold Atlas, a key piece of the aQuantive acquisition, to Facebook in 2013.

Microsoft acquired ScreenTonic on May 3, 2007, AdECN on July 26, 2007, and YaData on February 27, 2008, and merged their technologies into adCenter.

On February 23, 2009, Publisher Leadership Council was created under the umbrella of Microsoft Advertising. The council was responsible to deliver the next-generation advertising platform for the publishers of digital media resulting in the formation of Microsoft pubCenter.

In January 2010, Microsoft announced a deal in which it would take over the functional operation of Yahoo! Search, and set up a joint venture to sell advertising on both Yahoo! Search and Bing known as the Microsoft Search Alliance. A complete transition of all Yahoo! sponsored ad clients to Microsoft adCenter occurred in October 2010.

On September 10, 2012, adCenter was renamed to Bing Ads, and the Search Alliance was renamed the Yahoo! Bing Network.

In April 2015, the Yahoo! partnership was modified; Yahoo! Search will only have to feature Bing results on the "majority" of desktop traffic, leaving the company open to "enhance the search experience" non-exclusively on both desktop and mobile. Additionally, Microsoft will take over as the exclusive seller of ads delivered through Bing; Yahoo! will sell its own ads through its new in-house Gemini platform.

On June 29, 2015, AOL Inc. announced a deal and partnership to take over the majority of Microsoft's ad sales business. Under the pact, AOL will take over the sale of display, video, and mobile ads on various Microsoft platforms in nine countries, including Brazil, Canada, the United States, and the United Kingdom. As many as 1200 Microsoft employees involved with the business will be transferred to AOL. In turn, AOL's properties will replace Google Search with Bing, and display Bing Ads sold by Microsoft.

In May 2018, Bing Ads released additional productivity and time-saving tools for users managing their campaigns via Bing Ads Editor.

On April 30, 2019, Bing Ads was re-branded to Microsoft Ads.

On August 5, 2019, Microsoft acquired PromoteIQ, a leading provider of vendor marketing technology to online retailers and brands.

On December 21, 2021, Microsoft announced that plans to acquire Xandr from AT&T. Six months later, Microsoft disclosed that the acquisition has been completed.

Technology
Similar to Google Ads, Microsoft Ads uses both the maximum amount an advertiser is willing to pay per click (PPC) on their ad and the advertisement's click-through rate (CTR) to determine how frequently an advertisement is shown.  This system encourages advertisers to write effective ads and to advertise only on searches which are relevant to their advertisement.

Microsoft Ads allows advertisers to target their ads by restricting their ads to a given set of demographics and by increasing their bids whenever the ad is seen by a user of a certain demographic.  As of November 2006, no other PPC advertising system has a similar feature.  Similarly, Microsoft Ads allows advertisers to run their ads on specific days of the week or certain times of day.

Similar to Google Ads Editor, Microsoft Ads provides a desktop tool to manage campaigns offline, called as Microsoft Ads Editor.  Using this editor you can make offline changes to your campaigns and later sync it online.

Microsoft Ads also provides APIs that can be used to manage advertising campaigns.

See also
Microsoft adCenter Analytics

References

External links

Microsoft Ads Editor

Online advertising services and affiliate networks
Digital marketing companies of the United States
Pay-per-click search engines
Microsoft Bing
Microsoft cloud services